Chase Buchanan and Blaž Rola were the defending champions but chose not to defend their title.

Miķelis Lībietis and Dennis Novikov won the title after defeating Philip Bester and Peter Polansky 7–5, 7–6(7–4) in the final.

Seeds

Draw

References
 Main Draw

Columbus Challenger 1 - Doubles
Columbus Challenger